Ronald Micura is an Austrian chemist. He received his PhD working in the field of phycobilin pigments under the supervision of Karl Grubmayr in 1995. He was awarded the Lieben Prize in 2005.

Micura studied chemistry at the University of Linz, where he also received his Ph.D. in 1995. After a postdoc position at the University of Zurich and the Skaggs Institute for Chemical Biology, he became professor at the University of Innsbruck in 2000.

References

Year of birth missing (living people)
Living people
Austrian chemists
Johannes Kepler University Linz alumni